Sri Vengdajalpathi Perumal  Temple is a historical Hindu temple located in Kuppalnatham Village of Madurai District, Tamil Nadu, India. Sri vengdajalpathi perumal temple is around 700 years old, built in the 13th century by the Madurai Nayak Kingdom.

The temple has the shrines of vengdajalpathi, Arulmigu Sridevi and Bhudevi.  The temple is classified as a principal temple under the control of the Hindu Charities Department.  Proceedings are administered by the Administrator pending litigation. In 1971, freedom fighter INA T.V.Rangasamy Nayakar (a World War II veteran) took steps to develop the temple and its lands for the income of Venkatajalapathi Perumal Temple.  The temple complex wall was built in 2001.

Festival

Chithirai thiruvilla : Sri Venkatajalapathi Perumal, who resided in this temple, descends on the Chitra Poornami day in a white horse vehicle at Sri Kallazhakar Thirukolam in Kupalnatham village  and in  K. Paramanpatti, Kallazhakar descends and performs tirthamadi in river near Poigai malai.

The festival is celebrated by Kupalnatham  village and other villages like  K .Antipatti K.Paramanpatti and three more mandapadis namely Tantrarayar (Kuppalnatham Tantrayan temple hall) Sedapatti (Sedapattiyar mandapam), Malayapar (Malai Perumal temple hall), Poigai malai Jain cave temple  hall, Methnur Kallupatti (Kallupattayar mandapam).  , Chinnakattalai (Commandyar Mandapam) S. Chennampatti, (Chennampattiyar Mandapam) is a great festival that unites the people of various villages...

vaikunda ekathasi :  Vaikuntha Ekadashi is more special because it is believed that on this auspicious day the sorgavasal or the Supreme Gate of heaven opens.  On the day sri vengdajalpathi perumal   show the  karudar thirukolam It is called vaikutha ekathesi festival in Kuppalnatham village .

References 

Hindu temples in Madurai district